Heteropoma glabratum is a species of minute, salt marsh snails with an operculum, aquatic gastropod mollusks, or micromollusks, in the family Assimineidae. This species is endemic to Guam.

References

Assimineidae
Fauna of Guam
Gastropods described in 1894
Taxonomy articles created by Polbot